In Greek mythology, Calchinia (Ancient Greek: Καλχινίᾳ) was a Sicyonian princess as a daughter of King  Leucippus of Aegialea. She consorted with the sea-god Poseidona and bore him a son, Peratus. Leucippus reared his grandson and with the former's death, he handed over the kingdom to Peratus.

Note

References 

 Pausanias, Description of Greece with an English Translation by W.H.S. Jones, Litt.D., and H.A. Ormerod, M.A., in 4 Volumes. Cambridge, MA, Harvard University Press; London, William Heinemann Ltd. 1918. . Online version at the Perseus Digital Library
 Pausanias, Graeciae Descriptio. 3 vols. Leipzig, Teubner. 1903. Greek text available at the Perseus Digital Library.

Princesses in Greek mythology
Women of Poseidon
Sicyonian characters in Greek mythology